Thomas Henry Sprott, OBE (26 September 1856 – 25 July 1942) was an Anglican priest in the first half of the 20th century.

Life
Born on 26 September 1856 at Dromore, County Down, he was educated at Trinity College, Dublin and ordained in 1879. Following curacies at Holy Trinity, Kingston upon Hull and St John the Evangelist, Waterloo Road, he became Minister of St Barnabas', Mount Eden, Auckland in 1886.

From 1892 until 1911 Sprott was Vicar of St Paul's Pro-Cathedral, Wellington when he was elevated to the episcopate as the 4th bishop of Wellington, a post he held for 25 years. Described as a "a profound divine who for years tried to fathom the deeps of modern reasoning", he died on 25 July 1942. His wife Edith survived him and died in 1945, but his son (who was awarded the Military Cross in 1917) died on active service with the Norfolk Regiment in March 1918.

Legacy
Sprott House, a residential home for the elderly in Wellington, New Zealand, is named for him.

Notes

External links 
 Thomas Henry & Edith Sprott

1856 births
Christian clergy from County Down
Alumni of Trinity College Dublin
20th-century Anglican bishops in New Zealand
Anglican bishops of Wellington
New Zealand Officers of the Order of the British Empire
1942 deaths